Oxyplax ochracea is a moth of the family Limacodidae first described by Frederic Moore in 1883. It is found in Sri Lanka, Indonesia, India and Thailand.

It is a pest of orange, tea, and Camellia oleifera.

References

External links
A Study on the NPV of Oxyplax ochracea and Analysis of Its DNA Map with Restriction Endonucleases

Moths of Asia
Moths described in 1883
Limacodidae